Pilskie Towarzystwo Piłki Siatkowej Piła or simply PTPS Piła, is a Polish women's volleyball club based in Piła and playing in the Orlen Liga.

Previous names
Due to sponsorship, the club have competed under the following names:
 PTPS Prasa Piła (1993–1995) 
 PTPS Nafta Piła (1995–2001) 
 PTPS Nafta-Gaz Piła (2001–2006) 
 PTPS Nafta Piła (2006–2007)
 PTPS Farmutil Piła (2007–2009)
 PTPS Piła (2009–2013)
 PGNiG Nafta Piła (2013–2015)
 PTPS Piła (2015–2016)
 Enea PTPS Piła (2016–present)

History
The club was founded in May 1993 under the name , taking over the volleyball activities of B1 league side WKS Sokół. In its first season (1993–94) the club gained promotion to the A1 league, but without necessary support the club had financial issues and was relegated at the end of its first A1 league season. Supported by new sponsors, the club achieved league A1 promotion in 1997 with success following shortly after with 4 consecutive Polish Championships (1998–99, 1999–00, 2000–01, 2001–02) and 3 Polish Cup titles (1999–00, 2001–02, 2002–03) during a six-year period (from 1997 to 2003). Sponsorship issues in the following years affected the club's performances (it won the Polish Cup in 2007–08 and the Polish Super Cup in 2008) culminating in an agreement with Atom Trefl Sopot for the club's withdraw from the league in May 2010. In the agreement, made in order for PTPS to restructure, Atom Trefl and PTPS switched places (Atom took PTPS place in the highest league with PTPS replacing Atom in the second division). After its first season at the second division, the club gained promotion back to the highest league.

It has also participated in European competitions (Champions League, CEV Cup and Challenge Cup) finishing 4th in 1999–00 Champions League.

Honours

National competitions
  Polish Championship: 4
1998–99, 1999–00, 2000–01, 2001–02

  Polish Cup: 4
1999–00, 2001–02, 2002–03, 2007–08

  Polish Super Cup: 1
2008

Team
Season 2016–2017, as of March 2017.

References

External links

 Official website 

Volleyball clubs established in 1993
1993 establishments in Poland
Women's volleyball teams in Poland
Piła County
Sport in Greater Poland Voivodeship